The Missing is a British anthology drama television series written by brothers Harry and Jack Williams. It was first broadcast in the UK on BBC One on 28 October 2014, and in the United States on Starz on 15 November 2014. The Missing is an international co-production between the BBC and Starz. The first eight-part series, about the search for a missing boy in France, was directed by Tom Shankland. It stars Tchéky Karyo as Julien Baptiste, the French detective who leads the case, with James Nesbitt and Frances O'Connor as the boy's parents.

The second eight-part series, about a missing girl in Germany, was directed by Ben Chanan. It was broadcast in the UK, on BBC One, from 12 October 2016 and in the United States, on Starz, on 12 February 2017. Tchéky Karyo returns as Julien Baptiste, with David Morrissey and Keeley Hawes as the girl's parents.

Both series received positive reviews, with critics praising the cast, especially Tchéky Karyo's performance, and the storytelling. In February 2019, a spin-off series titled Baptiste was broadcast on BBC One, again starring Karyo and written by Jack and Harry Williams.

Series one

Production
Filming began in February 2014 with help from the Belgian government's tax shelter scheme. The series was co-produced by New Pictures, Company Pictures, Two Brothers Pictures and Playground Entertainment with Fortis Film Fund, Czar TV Productions and Vlaamse Radio- en Televisieomroeporganisatie. The distributor was All3Media who sold the series at MIPCOM. The series producer was Chris Clough and the executive producers were Charlie Pattinson, Willow Grylls and Elaine Pyke for New Pictures, John Yorke for Company Pictures, Harry and Jack Williams for Two Brothers Pictures, Polly Hill for the BBC, Colin Callender for Playground Entertainment and Eurydice Gysel for Czar TV Productions. The Missing was commissioned by Charlotte Moore and Ben Stephenson for BBC One.

Although the first story is set in France and the United Kingdom, most of the scenes were filmed in Huy, Halle, Charleroi and Brussels, Belgium, taking advantage of the Belgian Tax Shelter for film funding. Only a few scenes were shot in Paris and London.

Synopsis
Tony Hughes, his wife Emily and their five-year-old son Oliver, are travelling from the United Kingdom to northern France for a holiday. It is the summer of 2006, during the FIFA World Cup. Soon after entering France, their car breaks down. They are forced to spend the night in the fictional small town of Châlons du Bois. That evening, Tony and Oliver visit a crowded outdoor bar, where a quarter-finals football match is being watched. Tony loses sight of his son, who goes missing. Businessman Ian Garrett offers a reward for information leading to Oliver's capture, but it later emerges that, on discovering that Garrett is a paedophile, Tony beat Garrett to death and concealed the evidence.

Eight years later, Oliver has not been found; the police have closed their investigation. Now divorced, Tony has continued to search for his son after seeing a recent photograph in which a little boy is wearing a scarf identical to the one Oliver was wearing on the day he disappeared and made for him with a unique insignia. Tony contacts Julien Baptiste, the retired detective who led the original investigation, and they discover where Oliver was kept prisoner after his initial disappearance. The police are persuaded by Baptiste to reopen the case, but the investigation is hampered by the disappearance of a piece of evidence, given by a corrupt police officer to a journalist. Baptiste recovers the evidence of Garrett's murder but gives it to Tony, who he feels has already suffered enough. Eventually the pair discover that Oliver was killed shortly after his disappearance, but no one survives who can tell them what happened to his body. Emily makes a fresh start by remarrying, but Tony cannot accept that Oliver is dead, and continues to search.

Cast
James Nesbitt as Tony Hughes, father of the missing boy, Oliver Hughes. Tony feels partly responsible for his disappearance and has therefore devoted his life to finding his son.
Frances O'Connor as Emily Hughes, mother of Oliver and wife of Tony in 2006. Emily is devastated by the disappearance of her son and her relationship with Tony breaks down, leading her to start a relationship with detective Mark Walsh, to whom she is engaged in 2014.
Tchéky Karyo as Julien Baptiste, lead detective on Oliver's case. Julien rejoins Tony when they find further evidence in 2014, but is still scarred by past events. His daughter is a drug addict who refuses his help regularly.
Jason Flemyng as Mark Walsh; an English detective holidaying in Châlons De Bois in 2006. He starts a relationship with Emily.
Ken Stott as Ian Garrett; a property developer constructing his family holiday home near Châlons De Bois. Ian becomes a benefactor for the Hughes but holds dark secrets that could be linked to Oliver's disappearance.
Diana Quick as Mary Garrett; Ian's wife, still scarred by the disappearance of her own daughter years ago. 
Arsher Ali as Malik Suri; an English journalist who is determined to make his big break by any means. By bribing corrupt detective Khalid Ziane, he has obtained evidence that could lead to Oliver's killer.
Titus De Voogdt as Vincent Bourg; who is living near Châlons De Bois in 2006. He is the police's first suspect due to his reputation as a paedophile, and ends up setting out to 'cure' himself of his obsession.
Saïd Taghmaoui as Khalid Ziane; a corrupt police officer who hands vital evidence to Malik Suri and later resorts to violence to cover up his actions.
Anastasia Hille as Celia Baptiste; Julien's wife who is devastated by her daughter's addiction.
Oliver Hunt as Oliver Hughes; the Hughes' young son who vanishes on their holiday in 2006.
Jean-François Wolff as Alain Deloix; the owner of Hotel Eden, the hotel where the Hughes are staying in Châlons De Bois. He is a recovering alcoholic.
Eric Godon as Georges Deloix; Alain's brother and the Mayor of Châlons De Bois, who continually stops the police from reopening the case in 2014.
Émilie Dequenne as Laurence Relaud
Astrid Whettnall as Sylvie Deloix
Anamaria Marinca as Rini Dalca
Johan Leysen as Karl Sieg
Camille Schotte as Sara Baptiste; Julien Baptiste's daughter, suffering from addiction
Anjli Mohindra as Amara Suri, Malik's wife
Joséphine de La Baume as Monique Pelletier, an artist who starts a relationship with Tony.

Series two

Production
The second series was confirmed in December 2014 and production began in February 2016. Again written by Harry and Jack Williams, this series was directed by Ben Chanan. The filming locations were Morocco, Belgium (Malmedy, Brussels & Ghent) and Germany. Episode four shows a Hanover hospital (which was filmed in Az Sint-Lucas Ghent) and episode five shows soldiers marching over the Vesdre dam in eastern Belgium, and the fictional Vaaren in Switzerland is Monschau, in Germany.

Synopsis
The story is paralleled by flashbacks to 2014 and is set near a British army garrison in Eckhausen, Germany. In 2014 police tell Sam and Gemma Webster, whose daughter Alice went missing in 2003, that Alice has reappeared and claims she had been held captive with Sophie Giroux, a French girl who disappeared about the same time. Retired French detective Julien Baptiste, who was in charge of the Giroux investigation, cannot resist becoming involved again and travels to Germany and Iraq to find answers.

Cast
David Morrissey as Captain Sam Webster
Keeley Hawes as Gemma Webster, Sam's wife
Tchéky Karyo as Julien Baptiste
Anastasia Hille as Celia Baptiste, Julien's wife
Roger Allam as Brigadier Adrian Stone
Thomas Arnold as young Adrian
Laura Fraser as Sergeant Eve Stone, Adrian's daughter
Abigail Hardingham as Sophie Giroux
Eulalie Trillet as young Sophie
Jake Davies as Matthew Webster, Sam and Gemma's son
Chelsea Edge as Alice Webster
Madi Linnard as young Alice
Ólafur Darri Ólafsson as Stefan Andersen
Filip Peeters as Kristian Herz, a butcher
Lia Williams as Nadia Herz, Kristian's wife
Derek Riddell as Major Adam Gettrick, Press Officer
Florian Bartholomäi as Jorn Lenhart
Brian Bovell as Lieutenant Colonel Henry Reed
Dempsey Bovell as young Henry
Daniel Ezra as Trooper Daniel Reed, Henry's son
Diana Kent as Penny
Indica Watson as Lucy

Episodes

Series summary

Series one

Series two

Reception
The first series of The Missing earned a "Certified Fresh" score of 96% on Rotten Tomatoes, with an average rating of 8.4/10 out of 28 reviews. The site's critical consensus reads, "The Missing turns a common premise into a standout thriller with heartfelt, affecting performances." On Metacritic, the series has a score of 85 out of 100 based on 21 reviews, indicating "universal acclaim". The Guardian called it "hauntingly brilliant television". The Daily Telegraph described it as "supremely compelling". The Independent said it was "tense [...] absorbing [...] mercilessly believable". The New York Times wrote "The Missing is imaginatively written, well cast, chillingly believable and quite addictive. This kind of story has been told this way before, but somehow that doesn’t make this telling any less compelling."

Gerard O'Donovan, in The Telegraph referred to the final episode as "... a manipulation too far.... I mostly felt that sinking feeling you get when a book or series you've loved goes wrong in the final stretch".

In January 2015, at the 72nd Golden Globe Awards, the series was nominated for Best Miniseries or Television Film and Frances O'Connor was nominated for Best Actress – Miniseries or Television Film. For the 5th Critics' Choice Television Awards, James Nesbitt was nominated for Best Actor in a Movie/Miniseries. At the 2015 British Academy Television Awards, the series received four nominations — Best Drama Series, Radio Times Audience Award, Nesbitt for Best Actor and Ken Stott for Best Supporting Actor. For the 67th Primetime Emmy Awards, Tom Shankland received a nomination for Outstanding Directing for a Limited Series, Movie or a Dramatic Special.

On Rotten Tomatoes, the second series has earned a "Certified Fresh" score of 100%, with an average rating of 8.55/10 out of 15 reviews. The site's critical consensus reads, "The Missing's astute narrative and intense perplexity allow for more thrills and exciting guesswork in season 2." On Metacritic, the series has a score of 76 out of 100 based on 14 reviews, indicating "generally favorable reviews".

References

External links

 at Starz

2014 American television series debuts
2017 American television series endings
2010s American drama television series
2014 British television series debuts
2016 British television series endings
2010s British drama television series
BBC television dramas
British crime drama television series
2010s British mystery television series
English-language television shows
French-language television shows
Nonlinear narrative television series
Starz original programming
Television series by All3Media
Television series about missing people
Television shows set in France
Television shows set in Germany